The Leica Digilux 1 was released in 2002, roughly the same time as the Canon G2 and the Nikon 2000.  It is the second of Leica's digital offerings.  Where the original Digilux was developed in partnership with Fuji Camera, the Digilux 1 was developed in partnership with Panasonic with whom Leica continues to partner in sharing technologies—Leica shares their ability to design superb lenses, and Panasonic designs the camera electronics.  According to Leica, this allows both companies to design cameras that creates a harmonious matching of lens to sensor to produce color and contrast to Leica standards.

Billed as the digital reportage camera, the Leica Digilux 1 shares almost everything with its Panasonic brother, the DMC-LC5. At the time, the Digilux 1 boasted the lowest shutter lag in comparison to other cameras in its class, in combination with its fast lens, made the camera suitable for photo reportage / photojournalistic applications.  As for differences, the Digilux 1 is housed in a retro box that harkens back to the designs of Leica rangefinders, the LC5 is housed in a more modern casing, but retains identical controls.  In appearance and in size, it is very similar to the Leica CM Zoom.  Another unverified difference is believed to be based in image processing—some believe that the Digilux 1 performs less post processing, resulting in colors and contrast that are more in line with the color and contrast expected from a Leica camera.  The Panasonic DCM-LC5 performs post processing that increases contrast and saturation to create photos that are acceptable to the consumer market.

The camera has a Leica Vario-Summicron badged f2.0-2.5/7mm-21mm zoom lens. This lens first appeared on the Sony DSC-S70 and Epson PhotoPC 3000Z of June 2000. It was also used on the Canon G1, G2, Epson PhotoPC 3100Z, Panasonic DMC-LC5, DMC-L40, Sony DSC-S70, S75, S85 and Toshiba PDR-M70. The camera itself sold for around $1500 (2011 dollars). 

An uncommon feature of the Digilux 1 (and Panasonic DMC-LC5) versus all other Digilux cameras, is that the sensor uses a complementary CYGM filter (also used on the other cameras that used the same lens - see above) rather than the RGB of later models. This filter had two benefits: The range of wavelengths of light captured by the sensor was much greater - it captures about 2/3 of the visible spectrum versus RGB which captures only 1/3 of the visible spectrum, so that the colors, especially reds and blues are more saturated. This is a benefit for landscapes especially. The second benefit is that the CMYG filter allows the passage of twice the photons, so that the camera is inherently 2 x more sensitive to light at the base ISO of 100 - this means that exposure times are half that of a comparable camera with RGB filter array. The camera has a 3 x zoom lens from f2.0 at the widest 35mm equivalent focal length, and f2.8 at the 100 mm equivalent focal length. Compared with modern compact cameras that usually have an f 3.5 - f 5.6 maximum aperture, the Digilux 1 at f 2.8 at 100mm, is 3 f stops faster ( 2 f stops due to f2.8 vs f5.6 and one f stop due to its 2 x sensitivity.) To match exposure time under this focal length at max available aperture requires the second camera to be set to ISO 800 while the Digilux 1 is at ISO 100 [tested cameras side by side.]
Digilux 1 images are not noise suppressed as much as modern cameras, so it is always necessary to use a noise suppression filter in post processing when shooting above the base ISO of 100. If this is done, then ISO 400 images can be quite acceptable. AT ISO 400 and f 2.0, the exposure times will be the same as a compact camera with an f 3.5 lens at ISO 2400, and the noise levels on the Digilux 1 will be much less after post-processing.

If you run across old reviews of the camera from 2002, there is often a criticism of the noise levels and "smearing" or "watercolor" appearance. But with modern software, these issues are no longer problems. There are thousands of images on the WEB that attest to the quality of this camera (see also DMC-LC5 pictures.)

Light sensitivity: On sunny days the light is usually too intense for the camera which has a minimum aperture of f 8 and a minimum exposure time of 1/1000 second. It is necessary to add a polarizing filter of 3 f stops equivalent density (or a neutral density filter,) and this requires an adapter which extends the lens housing beyond the most extreme travel of the zoom lens. This adapter is available as part of a wide angle lens kit which while sold mainly for the Panasonic DMC-LC5, fits the Digilux 1. The WA lens adapter makes a 28 mm equivalent focal length, and with the Leica 28mm optical finder which fits the flash bracket, it makes a good quality WA camera.

Manual focus and Macro: The Digilux 1 and DMC-LC5 can be set for macro focus, and also manual focus (fly by wire.) 
Camera cards: It will handle up to a 1GB SD card only.

TIFF file format also: One of the biggest advantages is that the camera will shoot single frame TIFF files - each about 12 MB in size, and taking about 5 seconds to write to a fast SD card. These uncompressed files have none of the compression artifacts typical of JPEG files. But for rapid sequence shots the JPEG mode must be used. As also for auto exposure bracketing.

Flash: The built in flash is adjustable +- 2 EV, which is good for fill in flash.
Batteries: are readily available.

Manual Exposure: Full manual exposure is possible using the jog buttons. The display mimics the exposure changes rather than brightening up as the scene moves into darker areas, so that it is possible to see what the manual adjustments are doing to the image. The only problem is that for exposure time settings longer than 1/8 sec, the display won't match the actual exposed image.

See also
 Leica Camera
 Leica Digilux 2
 Leica Digilux 3
 Panasonic
 Lumix

References

External links
 Press release at launch of Leica Digilux 1
 Leica Digilux 1 User manual
 Photo.net review of Leica Digilux 1
 Ten year retrospective review of Leica Digilux 1

Digilux 1

de:Leica Digilux 1